Shiwa may refer to:

Shiwa, Iran, a village in Razavi Khorasan Province
Shiwa, Iwate, Japan, a town
Shiwa District, Iwate

See also
Shiwa Ngandu, a grand English-style country house and estate in the Northern Province of Zambia
Shiwa 2000, a Suomisoundi-style psychedelic trance group from Finland
Shiba (disambiguation)
Shiva (disambiguation)